Paravilla edititoides is a species of bee flies (insects in the family Bombyliidae).

References

Paravilla
Articles created by Qbugbot
Insects described in 1933